Rafael Nadal was the competition's defending champion and successfully defended his title, defeating David Goffin in the final, 6–4, 7–6(7–5).

Seeds

Draw

Draw

Play-offs

References

World Tennis Championship
2016 in Emirati tennis
2016 tennis exhibitions